16th District is the 16th district of Budapest, Hungary.

It consists of these parts: Árpádföld, Cinkota, Mátyásföld, Sashalom, Rákosszentmihály.

Sport
The oldest football and athletics team is Rákosszentmihályi AFC that competes in the Budapest Bajnokság I.

THSE Sashalom (or THSE Szabadkikötő) currently competes in the 2018-19 Nemzeti Bajnokság III.

Sightseeing
Erzsébetliget Theatre

Education
The College of International Management and Business Faculty of the Budapest Business School is located in the district.

Cinkota is also the home of the secondary school, Szerb Antal Gimnázium.

List of mayors

Twin towns – Twin cities
  Waltershausen – Germany
  Canistro – Italy
  Novi Vinodolski – Croatia
   – Ukraine
  Valea lui Mihai – Romania
  Opole – Poland
  Kütahya – Turkey
  Podunajské Biskupice – Slovakia
  Mali Iđoš – Serbia
  Wimbledon – United Kingdom
  Hanoi – Tay Ho – Vietnam
  Mont-Saint-Martin – France
  Mihăileni – Romania
  Oravița – Romania
  Cambridge – United Kingdom
  Dragomirești – Romania

References

External links